Dola Ben‑Yehuda Wittmann (12 July 1902 – 18 November 2004) was the daughter of Eliezer Ben-Yehuda who was the driving spirit behind the revival of the Hebrew language in the modern era. She and her brother Itamar Ben-Avi were the first native speakers of Hebrew in modern times.

Biography
She, her brother Itamar Ben-Avi as well as their siblings were the first native speakers of Hebrew in modern times. In 1921, she married Max Wittmann, a German who became the first non-Jewish language activist in Palestine to found a Hebrew-only family with a native speaker of Hebrew. At the time of her death, she was the world's oldest native speaker of Modern Hebrew. Both Dola and her husband are buried in the Alliance Church International Cemetery in the German Colony neighborhood of Jerusalem.

Relevance to linguistic scholarship on Hebrew
Dola's parents were the first people to raise a family in a strictly unilingual environment using only Modern Hebrew as a language for everyday use, thus producing the first native speakers of the language. Though it is common for modern linguists to have access to the last native speakers of dying languages, the opposite is rather exceptional. Modern Hebrew is the only known language to have afforded access to the first native speakers of a nascent "new" language, validating Eliezer Ben-Yehuda's claim that a "dead" and "holy" language such as Hebrew could be revived as a secular natively spoken language without the interference of religion and in spite of the opposition of the religious community. Dola survived her older brother by 60 years, well into a millennium in which Modern Hebrew had seven million speakers, including three million native speakers and many non-Jews.

Dola was a major contributor to the Dartmouth Jewish Sound Archive recording and wrote as well as performed the collection's introductory track. Dola being the most available example of the initial acquisition of Hebrew as a native language without a bilingual stage of learning, her learning history of Hebrew is evidence that her acquisition of the language did not pass through a stage of relexification from Slavic contrary to Wexler’s 1991 stance on the origin of Modern Hebrew.

References
Orbaum, Sam (2000). "Daughter of the Mother Tongue." Not Page One column, republished in Eskimos of Jerusalem And Other Extraordinary Israelis; 116 vivid stories of memorable people and places. Jerusalem, 2001.
Shavit, Zohar (2023). ‘’The Father of Modern Hebrew's Unusual Alliance With non-Zionist Jews.’’ ‘Haaretz’ (English edition), January 1, 2023.
Wittmann, Dola Ben-Yehuda (1991). Tracks 01, 03, 17, 19, 23, 63, 65, 68 of Tongue of Tongues: A documentary to mark the centenary of Spoken Hebrew (BBC Radio Three, November 9, 1989), edited by Lewis Glinert. Dartmouth Jewish Sound Archive, Hanover, NH.
Zuckermann, Ghil‘ad (2009). "Hybridity versus Revivability: Multiple Causation, Forms and Patterns." Journal of Language Contact, Varia 2.40-67.
Wexler, Paul (1991). 'The Schizoid Nature of Modern Hebrew: A Slavic Language in Search of a Semitic Past.' Wiesbaden: Otto Harrassowitz Verlag.

Notes

Hebrew language
Israeli centenarians
Women centenarians
1902 births
2004 deaths